Michael Anthony Proctor (born 3 October 1980) is an English former professional footballer who played as a striker.

Career

Sunderland
Born in Sunderland, Tyne and Wear, Proctor started his career with his hometown club Sunderland in their youth system and signed a professional contract with them on 29 October 1997. He made his first team debut for Sunderland against Everton in the League Cup on 11 November 1998, which finished as a 1–1 draw. He was loaned to Danish side Hvidovre in 2000 to recuperate from a cruciate ligament injury. He joined Halifax Town on loan in March 2001, making his debut against Cheltenham Town, in which he scored in a 4–2 win. He finished this loan spell with four goals in 12 appearances. He played at York City on loan during the 2001–02 season, making his debut in a 1–0 defeat against Rushden & Diamonds. He finished this spell with 49 appearances and 14 goals, making him York's top scorer for the season. He joined Bradford City on loan in August 2002. He scored the winning goal on his debut as Bradford defeated Ipswich Town 2–1, and became a favourite among fans, players, and the board. He scored a total of four goals in 12 games during his two-month spell, including a late equaliser as nine-man City drew 2–2 with Burnley, but he returned to Sunderland when manager Howard Wilkinson blocked another month's extension to the loan.

He scored the winner for Sunderland in their 2–1 win over Liverpool on 15 December 2002. One unfortunate claim to fame occurred whilst playing for Sunderland in 2003, in a 3–1 defeat to Charlton Athletic, where Proctor scored two own goals within just five minutes.

Rotherham United and Hartlepool United
Proctor left Sunderland in February 2004, joining Rotherham United in a swap deal for Darren Byfield. He joined Swindon Town on a month's loan deal in February 2005. Swindon could not afford to extend his loan at the club and he returned to Rotherham in March. He later moved to Hartlepool United on a free transfer in July 2005. He was best remembered by Hartlepool fans for scoring twice in a 3–1 over local rivals Darlington in a League Cup tie early in his Pools' career. He played just 32 games in two seasons for Hartlepool, scoring ten goals, before he was one of ten players released by Danny Wilson.

Wrexham
Proctor joined League Two club Wrexham on a month's loan in March 2007. This loan was extended until the end of the 2006–07 season in April. During this spell he scored two vital goals for Wrexham in their eventually successful survival bid. These were the winning goal in the 1–0 victory at local rivals Shrewsbury Town and the third goal in the Welsh club's 3–1 victory over Boston United which preserved the club's Football League status. He was released by Hartlepool in May 2007 and expressed an interest in joining Wrexham permanently. This move was confirmed in May 2007. He was transfer listed by Wrexham in May 2008 following the club's relegation to the Football Conference, despite finishing the season as the club's top scorer with 12 goals. In the summer of 2009 after talks with manager Dean Saunders, Proctor left the club by mutual consent.

Media Work

From the start of the 2014/15 season, Michael began to work as a co-host for Sun FM's Into The Light football show, discussing all things Sunderland with the duo of Stephen Goldsmith and Gareth Barker of the Wise Men Say podcast; Proctor added expert opinion to the comments of Goldsmith and Barker. This isn't an area of work Michael had intentionally planned on getting into after retiring, as he had previously been involved in coaching at East Durham College. Since becoming a frequent visitor to the Stadium of Light to undergo his media duties, Michael has begun to work closer with the Sunderland media team, most notably interviewing Jermain Defoe about his winning goal in a game against fierce rivals Newcastle United.

References

External links

1980 births
Living people
Footballers from Sunderland
English footballers
English expatriate footballers
Expatriate men's footballers in Denmark
English expatriate sportspeople in Denmark
Association football forwards
Sunderland A.F.C. players
Hvidovre IF players
Halifax Town A.F.C. players
York City F.C. players
Bradford City A.F.C. players
Rotherham United F.C. players
Swindon Town F.C. players
Hartlepool United F.C. players
Premier League players
English Football League players
National League (English football) players
Wrexham A.F.C. players